Northeast Health Science Magnet High School is a high school in Macon, Georgia, United States. It is part of the Bibb County School District.

Northeast consists of the combination of former Mark Smith High School, H. S. Lasseter High School, and Peter G. Appling High School.

Northeast's feeder schools include Peter G. Appling Middle School, Florence Bernd Elementary School, Burdell-Hunt Magnet Elementary School and Dr. Martin Luther King, Jr. Elementary School.

References

External links
 

Public high schools in Georgia (U.S. state)
Magnet schools in Georgia (U.S. state)
Schools in Macon, Georgia